Wildwood Flower is the fourth and final album from June Carter Cash. It was released in 2003 on the Dualtone record label, four months after her death and only a few days before the death of Johnny Cash, who provides backing vocals, making this the final release of his lifetime. It was produced by their son, John Carter Cash. The album's opening track, "Keep on the Sunny Side," was a Carter Family anthem that June Carter Cash had previously recorded twice with Johnny Cash: for the 1964 Carter Family album of the same title, and for the 1974 Johnny Cash album The Junkie and the Juicehead Minus Me. "The Road to Kaintuck," written by June, had previously been recorded by her husband on several occasions for Columbia Records. The medley of "Church in the Wildwood"/"Lonesome Valley" had been a regular part of Johnny Cash concerts in the 1970s.

A recording of "Hold Fast to the Right" from these sessions was included on The Unbroken Circle: The Musical Heritage of the Carter Family.

Track listing 
"Keep on the Sunny Side" (A.P. Carter)
"The Road to Kaintuck"
(Carter Girls Intro: "Blue Ridge Mountains of Virginia") "The Kneeling Drunkard's Plea" (June Carter Cash, Helen Carter, Anita Carter & Mother Maybelle Carter)
"Storms Are on the Ocean" (A.P. Carter)
(Little Junie Intro) "Temptation"
(June's story about Lee Marvin) "Big Yellow Peaches" (June Carter Cash)
"Alcatraz"
"Sinking in the Lonesome Sea" (A.P. Carter)
"Church in the Wildwood" / "Lonesome Valley" (A.P. Carter)
"Cannonball Blues" (A.P. Carter)
"Will You Miss Me When I'm Gone?" (A.P. Carter)
"Anchored in Love" (A.P. Carter)
"Wildwood Flower" (A.P. Carter)

Personnel 
June Carter Cash – vocals, autoharp
Johnny Cash – vocals on "Road To Kaintuck" and "Temptation", backing vocals
Laura Cash – fiddle, acoustic guitar, photography, violin, backing vocals
John Carter Cash –	art direction, producer 
 Lorrie Carter Bennett – backing vocals
 Nancy Blake –	cello, mandolin
 Norman Blake – acoustic guitar 
 Carlene Carter – choir/chorus,  backing vocals
 Janette Carter – vocals
 Joe Lee Carter – vocals, backing vocals
 Dennis Crouch – bass 
 Dale Jett – acoustic guitar, vocals 
 Rick Lonow – drums, percussion
 Tiffany A. Lowe – backing vocals
 Barbara Poole – bass

Chart performance

References

2003 albums
June Carter Cash albums
Albums published posthumously